My Old Man is a 2006 album compiled by Rosanna Goodman in tribute to her father, folk singer-songwriter Steve Goodman. The twelve tracks are all covers of songs written by Steve Goodman.

Track listing
 Ana Egge, "Old Fashioned"
 Matt Keating and Emily Spray, "Danger"
 Crescent and Frost, "If She Were You"
 Chris Brown, "Yellow Coat"
 Luther Wright and the Wrongs, "City of New Orleans"
 Chris Brown and Kate Fenner, "The Ballad of Penny Evans"
 Luther Wright and the Wrongs, "Jessie’s Jig"
 Anna Hovhannessian, "A Lover Is Forever"
 Rosanna Goodman, "My Old Man"
Tony Scherr, "Just Lucky I Guess"
 Kate Fenner, "I Just Keep Falling In Love"
 Teddy Kumpel, "Watching Joey Glow"

External links
 Press Release (pdf)

2006 compilation albums
Tribute albums
Folk compilation albums